Lasha Bekauri (born 26 July 2000) is a Georgian judoka. He won the gold medal in the men's 90 kg event at the 2020 Summer Olympics in Tokyo, Japan. He also won the gold medal in his event at the 2019 Judo World Masters and the 2021 European Judo Championships.

Career
He won the silver medal in the men's 90 kg event at the 2019 Summer Universiade held in Naples, Italy. In that same year, he won the gold medal in the men's 90 kg event at the 2019 Judo World Masters held in Qingdao, China.

He won one of the bronze medals in the men's 90kg event at the 2021 Judo World Masters held in Doha, Qatar. A month later, he won the gold medal in his event at the 2021 Judo Grand Slam Tel Aviv held in Tel Aviv, Israel. A few months later, he also won the gold medal in his event at the 2021 European Judo Championships held in Lisbon, Portugal.

Achievements

References

External links
 
 
 

Living people
2000 births
People from Kakheti
Male judoka from Georgia (country)
Universiade medalists in judo
Universiade medalists for Georgia (country)
Medalists at the 2019 Summer Universiade
Olympic judoka of Georgia (country)
Olympic medalists in judo
Olympic gold medalists for Georgia (country)
Medalists at the 2020 Summer Olympics
Judoka at the 2020 Summer Olympics
21st-century people from Georgia (country)